Longview Independent School District is a public 5A school district based in Longview, Texas (USA).

In addition to serving most of Longview, the district serves the city of Lakeport, most of Easton, a very small portion of East Mountain, and rural areas in eastern Gregg County.

History
The Longview Independent School District was under a desegregation order from the federal judiciary beginning in 1970, when a judge mandated racial integration by closing some majority Black schools and other changes intended to help African-American students. The order lasted until June 2018, when a judge released it from the order. The LISD board passed measures to keep desegregation programs in place that year.

Schools

High School (Grades 9-12)
Longview High School
Middle Schools (Grades 6-8)
Forest Park Magnet School of Global Studies
1994-96 National Blue Ribbon School
Foster Middle School
Judson Middle School
LISD Montessori Learning Academy
Elementary Schools
Bramlette Elementary School (Grades PK-5)
J.L. Everhart Magnet Academy of Cultural Studies (PK-3)
G.K. Foster Montessori Magnet School (Grades PK-K)
Hudson PEP Elementary School (Grades 1-5)
2003 National Blue Ribbon School
Johnston-McQueen Elementary School (Grades PK-5)
McClure Magnet School of International Studies (Grades 4-5)
Clarence W. Bailey Elementary School (Grades PK-5)
Ned E. Williams Elementary (Grades PK-5)
Ware Elementary School (Grades PK-5)
Alternative Education
LEAD Academy (Grades 9-12) 
Benny J. Dade Center (Grades 5-12)

References

External links
Official website
Magnet Schools of Longview

School districts in Gregg County, Texas
School districts in Rusk County, Texas